Epiblema lochmoda is a species of moth of the family Tortricidae. It is found in India (Jammu and Kashmir).

The ground colour of the forewings is white cream, sprinkled and strigulated with brownish grey and suffused with the same colour in the costal fourth and terminal third of the wing. The hindwings are brownish.

References

External links

Moths described in 2006
Endemic fauna of India
Moths of Asia
Eucosmini
Taxa named by Józef Razowski